Fowl are birds belonging the biological orders Galliformes (gamefowl or landfowl) or Anseriformes (waterfowl).

Fowl may also refer to:

Arts, entertainment, and media
 Artemis Fowl, a book series written by Eoin Colfer
 F.O.W.L., an evil organization in Darkwing Duck and the DuckTales reboot.
 Fowl Records, a record label
 Orion Fowl, a character in the novel Artemis Fowl: The Atlantis Complex
 Ms. Winifred Fowl, a character in the Jimmy Neutron movie and series

Other uses
 Fan-out wafer-level packaging or FOWL packaging, an integrated circuits packaging technology
 Fowl River, a river in Alabama
 Friends of WikiLeaks or FoWL, a social network in support of WikiLeaks

See also
Foul (disambiguation)